Marian Burros (born in Waterbury, Connecticut) is a cookbook author, and food columnist for The New York Times, a position she has held since 1983. Previously, Burros was The Washington Post's food editor and a consumer reporter for an NBC affiliate, a position for which she won an Emmy Award.

Burros has also worked for NBC Radio Network News, United Features, The Washington Daily News and The Washington Star.

Early life 
Burros graduated with a degree in English literature from Wellesley College in 1954.

Career

She started her career as a teacher of cookery.

In 1969, she had a recipe column in the Bridgeport Telegram, titled "Chef Marian's Dish of the Day." The column ran until the early 1970s.

She was the food editor for The Washington Post from 1974 to 1981. She started with The New York Times as a food reporter in 1981 and became a food columnist in 1983.

She was the first to break the story of ITT Continental Baking Company's reduced-calorie, high-fiber Fresh Horizons Bread, which contained powdered cellulose, derived from wood pulp. 

Burros has won numerous awards, including an Emmy in 1973 for her consumer reporting on WRC-TV; the American Association of University Women Mass Media Award for consumer reporting and nutrition education; a 1988 citation from the National Press Club for her coverage of food safety issues in The Times; and a Penney-Missouri Award. She is also a three-time winner of the Vesta Award. She has received a National Press Club citation (for food safety coverage), the American Association of University Women Mass Media Award and is a three-time winner of the Vesta Award.

Personal life
She has two children and lives in New York City and Bethesda, Maryland.

Books
 Elegant But Easy (Collier Books, 1962) with Lois Levine
 Second Helpings (Collier Books, 1964) with Lois Levine
 Freeze With Ease (MacMillan, 1967) with Lois Levine
 Come for Cocktails, Stay for Supper (MacMillan, 1970)
 Summertime Cookbook (MacMillan, 1972)  Tastemaker Award winner
 Pure and Simple (William Morrow, 1978) Tastemaker Award winner
 Keep It Simple (William Morrow, 1981)
 You've Got It Made (William Morrow, 1984)
 The Best of De Gustibus (Simon & Schuster, 1988)
 20-Minute Menus (Simon & Schuster, 1989)
 Eating Well is the Best Revenge (Simon & Schuster, 1995)
 Cooking for Comfort (Simon & Schuster, 209 pp, 2003)
 The New Elegant But Easy Cookbook (Simon and Schuster, 2003)

References

Sources

External links
Burros at the Simon and Schuster website

Living people
American food writers
Year of birth missing (living people)
The New York Times columnists
Writers from Waterbury, Connecticut
The Washington Post people
Emmy Award winners
Wellesley College alumni
American columnists
Women food writers
American women columnists
Women cookbook writers
Consumer rights activists
James Beard Foundation Award winners
21st-century American women